Alberto Fontanesi (10 March 1929 – 1 April 2016) was an Italian footballer who played as a forward. He competed in the men's tournament at the 1952 Summer Olympics.

References

External links
 

1929 births
2016 deaths
Italian footballers
Italy international footballers
Olympic footballers of Italy
Footballers at the 1952 Summer Olympics
Footballers from Lombardy
Association football forwards
People from Castel d'Ario
Sportspeople from the Province of Mantua